Facundo Nicolás Curuchet (born 21 January 1990) is an Argentine professional footballer who plays as a forward for Cienciano.

Career
Curuchet's first club was Pueblo Nuevo, prior to a move to Colón. He made his pro debut on 16 May 2010 against Estudiantes, with the forward netting the club's only goal in a 1–4 defeat. Curuchet went on to make eighty-four appearances for the club across six seasons, five of which were in the Primera División; taking his goal tally to nine in the process, including six in the 2012–13 season. During 2012–13, he also scored on his Copa Sudamericana bow versus Racing Club in August 2012. January 2015 saw Curuchet join Defensa y Justicia on loan. Two appearances came before he returned midway through the year.

Curuchet spent the rest of 2015 with Santamarina in Primera B Nacional. After one goal and twenty-one matches for Santamarina, Curuchet subsequently departed Colón permanently after agreeing a move to Juventud Unida in February 2016. A further move in the second tier with Independiente Rivadavia arrived six months later. Ahead of the 2017–18 campaign, Curuchet signed for Primera B Metropolitana's Platense. He scored nine goals against nine opponents in his first season, helping Platense win the title to gain promotion to Primera B Nacional.

Personal life
Curuchet's brother, Cristian, also played football professionally.

Career statistics
.

Honours
Platense
Primera B Metropolitana: 2017–18

References

External links

1990 births
Living people
Sportspeople from Entre Ríos Province
Argentine people of French descent
Argentine footballers
Argentine expatriate footballers
Association football forwards
Argentine Primera División players
Primera Nacional players
Primera B Metropolitana players
Club Atlético Colón footballers
Defensa y Justicia footballers
Club y Biblioteca Ramón Santamarina footballers
Juventud Unida de Gualeguaychú players
Independiente Rivadavia footballers
Club Atlético Platense footballers
Cienciano footballers
Argentine expatriate sportspeople in Peru
Expatriate footballers in Peru